The 1961–62 Midland Football League season was the 62nd in the history of the Midland Football League, a football competition in England.

Due to financial problems the league folded and no matches were played in the previous season.

Clubs
The league featured six clubs which competed in the previous season, along with twelve new clubs.
Club spent previous season without league football:
Skegness Town

Returned to the league after one season in the Central Alliance:
Denaby United
Goole Town
Sutton Town
Worksop Town

Returned to the league after one season in both the Central Alliance and the Yorkshire League:
Gainsborough Trinity

Joined from the Central Alliance:
Alfreton Town
Belper Town
Bourne Town
Grantham
Heanor Town
Ilkeston Town
Long Eaton United
Loughborough United
Matlock Town
Spalding United
Stamford

Joined from the Yorkshire League:
Retford Town

League table

References

External links

M
Midland Football League (1889)